Rhododendron cinnabarinum (朱砂杜鹃) is a rhododendron species native to eastern Nepal, Bhutan, Sikkim, southeastern Tibet, and southwest China, where it grows at altitudes of . It is a straggling evergreen
The flowers are yellow to cinnabar red, sometimes ranging to plum colors.

References

 "Rhododendron cinnabarinum", J. D. Hooker, Rhododendr. Sikkim-Himalaya. 1: t. 8. 1849.

cinnabarinum
Plants described in 1849
Taxa named by Joseph Dalton Hooker
Flora of Nepal
Flora of East Himalaya
Flora of Tibet
Flora of China